A bobblehead, also known by nicknames such as nodder, wobbler, or wacky wobbler, is a type of small collectible figurine. Its head is often oversized compared to its body. Instead of a solid connection, its head is connected to the body by a spring or hook in such a way that a light tap will cause the head to move around, or "bobble", hence the name.

History

During the seventeenth century, figurines of Buddha and other religious figures called "temple nodders" were produced in Asia. The earliest known Western reference to a bobblehead is thought to be in Nikolai Gogol's 1842 short story "The Overcoat", in which the main character's neck was described as being "like the necks of plaster cats which wag their heads". During the nineteenth century, bisque porcelain bobbleheads were being made in limited quantities for the US market. Many of the bobbleheads in the US were produced in Germany, with an increase in imports during the 1920s and 1930s. By the 1950s, bobbleheads had a substantial surge in popularity, with items made of either plastic or bisque porcelain.

By 1960, Major League Baseball (MLB) produced a series of papier-mâché Bobblehead dolls, one for each team, all with the same cherubic face, and a few select players over time. The World Series held that year brought the first player-specific baseball bobbleheads, for Roberto Clemente, Mickey Mantle, Roger Maris, and Willie Mays, still all with the same face. Over the next decade bobbleheads were also made of ceramic. Within a few years, they would be produced for other sports, as well as cartoon characters. One of the most famous bobbleheads of all time also hails from this era: the Beatles bobblehead set, which is a valuable collectible today.

The next increase in popularity was in the late 1990s. Although older bobbleheads such as the baseball teams and the Beatles were sought after by collectors during this period, new bobblehead dolls were uncommon. Prompting their resurgence were cheaper manufacturing processes, and the main bobblehead material switched, this time from ceramic to plastic. It was now possible to make bobbleheads in the limited numbers necessary for them to be viable collectibles. On August 2, 1997, the minor league Birmingham Barons gave away Barons Bobblehead Doll bobbleheads at a game. The first MLB team to offer a bobblehead giveaway was the San Francisco Giants, which distributed 35,000 Willie Mays head nodders at their May 9, 1999 game.

The variety of bobbleheads has grown to include even relatively obscure popular culture figures and notable people. The new millennium brought a new type of bobblehead toy, the mini-bobblehead, two or three inches tall and used for free gifts in some package foods. Post Cereals packaged 22 million mini-bobble heads of MLB players with its cereal before opening day in 2002.

On November 18, 2014, it was announced that the National Bobblehead Hall of Fame and Museum would open in 2016 in Milwaukee, Wisconsin. The National Bobblehead Hall of Fame and Museum held a preview exhibit at RedLine Milwaukee from January 7, 2016, to April 30, 2016, which showcased the largest public display of bobbleheads in history. The 2000s also saw the rise of a competitive market for personalized, on-demand bobbleheads, typically 6–7 inches tall, from a number of online vendors. In 2015, the Pope Francis bobblehead became so popular that a nationwide shortage was reported.

January 7, 2015 was the inaugural National Bobblehead Day in the US. In 2016, the Guinness Book of World Records mark for world's largest bobblehead was set at 15 feet 4 inches tall. Named "Goldie" a St. Bernard, the mascot of Applied Underwriters, it was created for Applied Underwriters, designed by Nate Wells, constructed by Dino Rentos and BobbleHeads.com.

Thanjavur dolls of India

Thanjavur dolls are a type of Indian bobblehead dolls known as "Thanjavur Thalayatti Bommai" in the Tamil language, meaning "Tanjore Head-Shaking Doll". They are a native art form in the Thanjavur region of Tamil Nadu. These dolls are usually 6" to 12" tall (15 to 30 cm). They are made of clay or wood and painted over in bright colors, and are often dressed up in fancy clothes. They form a part of an elaborate display of dolls known as "Golu (kolu)", exhibited in Indian houses during the "Dasara (Navaratri)" festival in Sep-Oct. These dolls are examples of how to start separating out the movements of three distinct part of body, namely, head, torso, and the hip and skirt parts.

A different version of these, 'Thalayatti Bommai' are the king and queen versions where the purpose is to show that the semi-circular bottoms, filled with sands, do not topple with a structure that is sharply raising, a mode that is used in building the Thanjavur Peruvudaiyar Koil. The recent excavations near the walls of the temple shows bases filled with sands of different colors that indicate that the architecture of the temple has lot more planning than simple stacking of the heavy stones.

In popular culture
 Sports teams sometimes give away bobblehead dolls at their games; for example, the Los Angeles Kings gave away bobbleheads commemorating Luc Robitaille's induction into the Hockey Hall of Fame.
 In the 1986 "Let's Go Mets" music video, there is a scene where Joe Piscopo, standing outside the New York Mets' dugout at Shea Stadium, taps four Mets bobblehead dolls, then goes into the dugout and taps the heads of four actual Mets players (Howard Johnson, Bob Ojeda, Rick Aguilera, Kevin Mitchell) who "bobble" their heads in a similar fashion. Piscopo then attempts to tap a fifth player (Lee Mazzilli) but is rebuffed and subsequently tackled by all of the players.
 In 2001, Audi broadcast commercials in Europe featuring an Elvis impersonator and a prototypical Wackel-Elvis ("Wobble Elvis" or "Wobbly Elvis") dashboard figure with a wobbling left arm and hip. Due to subsequent demand 165,000 Wackel-Elvis dashboard figures were produced. The figure depicts Elvis wearing the jumpsuit he wore in the 1973 Aloha from Hawaii TV broadcast.
 Since 2003, American law journal The Green Bag has issued bobblehead dolls depicting Justices of the Supreme Court of the United States, both past and present.
 In the season two episode "Valentine's Day" of NBC's The Office, Dwight Schrute is given a bobblehead doll of himself by Angela Martin as a Valentine's Day gift.
 In 2010, 14-year-old Henry Ermer of Brooklyn, New York, attempted to enter the Guinness Book of World Records by building what is believed to be the world's largest bobblehead, standing 16 feet tall.
 On the 2012 season premiere episode of ABC's The Bachelorette, contestant Chris Bukowski presented bachelorette Emily Maynard with custom bobbleheads of the two of them in an attempt to impress her and further himself in the competition.
 Bobbleheads are also a known characteristic feature of the videogame Fallout series
 Boy from the animated series Boy Girl Dog Cat Mouse Cheese is seen in multiple episodes to have a large bobblehead collection.
Nowadays, custom bobbleheads are designed based on a person's picture and given in the form of gifts on various occasions.

Promotional merchandise by American corporations
 Newsies "Broadway" Bobblehead
 Richardson e-learning 5-year trade show giveaway.
 Meteorologist Dave Brown WMC-TV Bobblehead

In film
Bobbleheads: The Movie is a 2020 Nepali-American computer-animated comedy film about four bobbleheads who protect their home from two uninvited relatives while their owners are away for the weekend. The film, directed by Kirk Wise, was released on December 8, 2020 (in the United States) by Universal 1440 Entertainment, with Threshold Entertainment and Incessant Rain Studios using Nvidia GPUs remotely via Microsoft Azure, featuring Brenda Song, Karen Fukuhara, Julian Sands, Khary Payton, Anthony Destefanis, Grey Griffin, Hala Finley, Luke Wilson, Jennifer Coolidge and Cher.
 In Are We There Yet?, a Satchel Paige Bobblehead (voiced by Tracy Morgan), Nick's prized possession, acts as his confidante, and speaks to him through his conscience, giving him advice on dating.

See also

 Akabeko
 Bobble-head doll syndrome
 Funko
 Head bobble
 
 National Bobblehead Hall of Fame and Museum

References

Bibliography
 Hunter, Tim (2000). Bobbing Head Dolls: 1960–2000. Krause Publications. .

Dolls
Baseball culture
Articles containing video clips
Novelty items